Mouthpiece is a 2018 Canadian drama film directed by Patricia Rozema. Based on the theatrical play by Amy Nostbakken and Norah Sadava, the film centres on Cassandra, a woman who is making the arrangements for her mother's funeral. Cassandra is played by both Nostbakken and Sadava, as a dramatization of her inner conflict.

It premiered at the 2018 Toronto International Film Festival.

Plot

A young writer, Cassandra, struggles to write a eulogy for her late mother, Elaine, who gave up her career to raise her children.

Cast
 Amy Nostbakken as Cassandra
 Norah Sadava as Cassandra
 Maev Beaty as Elaine
 Jess Salgueiro as Roxanne
 Jake Epstein as Danny
 Ari Cohen as Dad
 Bruce Hunter as Uncle Jake
 Sharon Lewis as Barbara
 Jennifer Podemski as Mrs. Cappo
 Ishan Davé as Ex-Boyfriend

Reception
The site's critical consensus reads, "Mouthpiece interrogates gender norms with wit and ingenuity, portraying its main character's inner conflict through a pair of separate performances."

Glenn Sumi of Now gave the film a 4/5 rating, writing, "[Patricia] Rozema's version of Amy Nostbakken and Norah Sadava's award-winning stage play does more than just open the work up; it fills in key bits of information, shows us Cassandra out and about in Toronto and gives everything an affecting emotional resonance." Scott Tobias of Variety called it "a thoughtful interrogation of modern womanhood, leavened by gallows humor." Pamela Hutchinson of Sight & Sound wrote: "While the script's cleverness and wordplay betray its stage origins, it's bracingly sharp, and explicitly a feminist text."

In December 2018, the Toronto International Film Festival named the film to its annual year-end Canada's Top Ten list.

References

External links
 

2018 films
Canadian drama films
Films set in Ontario
Films shot in Ontario
Films directed by Patricia Rozema
Films based on Canadian plays
English-language Canadian films
2010s English-language films
2010s Canadian films